The highest-earning musicians, also published as the "highest-paid musicians", have been reported annually by Forbes since at least 1987. For measurement, the magazine used pretax earnings—before deducting fees for agents, managers or lawyers. Most of the lists were estimated within a June-to-June scoring period, except for 1999, 2000, and 2021 when a calendar year period was used instead.

U2 have become the annual highest-earning musicians five times, more than any other act. Michael Jackson is the first musician to earn over $100 million in a year (1989), and has become the top-earning male soloist a record seven times. Dr. Dre currently holds the record for the highest annual earnings for a musician ever, collecting $620 million in 2014.

Madonna is the first woman in music to earn $100 million for a year (2009) and has the most years as the top-earning female musicians (11 times). Taylor Swift is the female artist with the highest-earning ever in a year (first with $170 million in 2016, and $185 million in 2019), breaking previous record-holders Madonna ($125 million in 2013) and Katy Perry ($135 million in 2015).

Highest-earning musicians by year

Group

Male

Female

Highest-earning musicians by decade

2010s

Notes

References

Print sources
 
 

Highest-earning musicians
Top people lists